Alma Maria Rosé (3 November 1906 – 4/5 April 1944) was an Austrian violinist of Jewish descent. Her uncle was the composer Gustav Mahler. She was deported by the Nazis to the concentration camp at Auschwitz-Birkenau. There, for 10 months, she directed an orchestra of female prisoners who played for their captors to stay alive.  As director, Rosé held the status of kapo of the music block.

Rosé died in the concentration camp of a sudden illness, possibly food poisoning. Her experiences in the camp were depicted in  Playing for Time.

Early years 
Alma Rosé's father was the violinist Arnold Rosé (né Rosenblum; 1863–1946) who was the leader of the Vienna Philharmonic Orchestra for 50 years: from 1881 to 1931 as well as leader of the Vienna State Opera orchestra and leader of the legendary Rosé String Quartet. Her mother, Justine (died 22 August 1938), was Gustav Mahler's sister. Alma was named for her uncle Gustav's wife, Alma Mahler (née Schindler).

Marriage 
Alma grew up to be a violinist. In 1930 she married the Czech violinist Váša Příhoda (1900–1960). In 1935 the marriage was dissolved.

Career 
Rosé had a highly successful career. In 1932 she founded the woman's orchestra, Die Wiener Walzermädeln (The Waltzing Girls of Vienna). The concertmistress was Anny Kux, a friend. The ensemble played to a very high standard, undertaking concert tours in Austria, Germany, Czechoslovakia, and Poland.

Escape from the Nazis and final arrest 
After the annexation of Austria with Germany in 1938 Alma and her father Arnold, also a famous violin virtuoso, managed to escape to London. She went on her own to the Netherlands where she believed she could resume her musical career.

When the Germans occupied the Netherlands, she was trapped. A fictitious marriage  to a Dutch engineer named August van Leeuwen Boomkamp did not protect her; nor did her nominal status as a Christian convert. She fled to France, but in late 1942 when she tried to escape to neutral Switzerland, she was arrested by the Gestapo. After several months in the internment camp of Drancy, she was deported in July 1943 to the concentration camp at Auschwitz.

Auschwitz 
Upon arrival in Auschwitz, Rosé was quarantined and became very ill, but eventually recovered. She assumed leadership of the Mädchenorchester von Auschwitz (Girls Orchestra of Auschwitz). The orchestra had been in existence before Rosé's arrival, a pet project of SS-Oberaufseherin ("SS chief supervisor") Maria Mandel. Before Rosé, the orchestra was conducted by Zofia Czajkowska, a Polish teacher. The ensemble consisted mainly of amateur musicians, with a string section, but also accordions, percussion, guitars, flute, recorder and mandolins, but lacked a brass section. Singers and music-copyists rounded-out the membership of the Music Block. The orchestra's primary function was to play at the main gate each morning and evening as the prisoners left for and returned from their work assignments; the orchestra also gave weekend concerts for the prisoners and the SS and entertained at SS functions.

Rosé conducted, orchestrated and sometimes played violin solos during its concerts. Apart from the official activity, she had the band rehearse and play forbidden music by Polish and Jewish composers to boost the spirits of band members and fellow inmates they trusted. She herself orchestrated Fryderyk Chopin’s Etude in E major, Op. 10, No. 3 and combined it with the lyrics she wrote. The conductor's strict and perfectionistic teaching style helped mold the orchestra into an excellent ensemble, all of whose members survived during her tenure, and after her death, all except two (Lola Kroner and Julie Stroumsa) would live to see the end of the war. Rosé instructed orchestra members that they would "survive together or die together. There was no halfway road".

Rosé died, aged 37, of a sudden illness at the camp, possibly food poisoning. During this illness, Josef Mengele signed an order for spinal tap on Rosé. The orchestra included several professional musicians, cellist Anita Lasker-Wallfisch and vocalist/pianist Fania Fénelon, each of whom wrote memoirs of their time in the orchestra, but also Claire Monis and Hélène Rounder-Diatkin (fr), who both survived as well. Fénelon's account, Playing for Time, was made into a television film of the same name, and was decried by orchestra survivors as being misleading, and containing preposterous distortions of the truth.

Alma's father, Arnold Rosé died in England in 1946. Her brother, Alfred Rosé and his wife Maria Schmutzer Rosé, had fled Germany in 1938, eventually settling in Cincinnati, Ohio, prior to their move to London, Ontario, Canada, in the late 1940s, following Alfred's engagement to offer a summer opera workshop, through the invitation of Harvey Robb.

Recordings 
Arnold Rosé's performances together with Alma were eventually released on CD.

See also 
Alice Herz-Sommer

References

Further reading 
 Richard Newman & Karen Kirtley: Alma Rosé: Vienna to Auschwitz. Amadeus Press 
Richard Newman & Karen Kirtley: Alma Rose Wien 1906 – Auschwitz 1944. Weidle Verlag. 
 Fania Fénelon: Playing for Time Syracuse University Press (December 1997); 
 Anita Lasker Wallfisch: Inherit the Truth, Thomas Dunne Books; 1st edition (April 22, 2000), 
 Rachela Zelmanowicz Olewski: Crying is forbidden here!, Olewski Family; 1st edition (April 15, 2009),

Theater 
 Claudio Tomati: Alma Rosé Sedizioni a Teatro (2006);

External links 

 Profile

1906 births
1944 deaths
Jewish violinists
Austrian violinists
Austrian conductors (music)
Austrian people who died in Auschwitz concentration camp
Austrian civilians killed in World War II
Austrian people of Romanian-Jewish descent
Musicians from Vienna
20th-century conductors (music)
20th-century violinists
Women classical violinists
20th-century women musicians
Austrian Jews who died in the Holocaust
Kapos (concentration camp)
Women's Orchestra of Auschwitz members